Frederick Albert Hucul (born December 4, 1931) is a Canadian former professional ice hockey player who played 164 games in the National Hockey League (NHL) for the Chicago Black Hawks and St. Louis Blues between 1951 and 1968. The rest of his career, which lasted from 1951 to 1969, was spent in the minor leagues. He shares the NHL record for the longest gap between NHL appearances, 13 years, along with his former Chicago teammate, Larry Zeidel.

Career
A star in junior hockey with the Moose Jaw Canucks and Regina Capitals, he immediately broke in with the Chicago Black Hawks and played for them for four seasons. He then was sent to the minors and spent the bulk of his professional career in the Western Hockey League with the Calgary Stampeders and Victoria Maple Leafs. For six years in Calgary and in Victoria, he was teamed with his brother Sandy Hucul. In the 1955-56 season Hucul scored 21 goals and 38 assists. Upon the NHL's expansion, Hucul signed with the St. Louis Blues and began their inaugural season on the Blues blue line. However, before the playoffs he was sent to the Blues' minor league team the Kansas City Blues in the Central Hockey League where he replaced Doug Harvey as the Kansas City Blues coach and general manager, after Harvey was called up to the parent Blues for the Stanley Cup Playoffs. Hucul guided the Kansas City Blues through two losing seasons before being replaced. He gave coaching one more try in 1971–72 and led the Victoria Cougars of the WCHL to an 18-48-2 record before being fired.

Career statistics

Regular season and playoffs

External links
 

1931 births
Living people
Buffalo Bisons (AHL) players
Calgary Stampeders (WHL) players
Canadian ice hockey coaches
Canadian ice hockey forwards
Chicago Blackhawks players
Denver Invaders players
Ice hockey people from Saskatchewan
Kansas City Blues players
Moose Jaw Canucks players
Quebec Aces (QSHL) players
St. Louis Blues players
St. Louis Flyers players
Tulsa Oilers (1964–1984) players
Victoria Cougars (WHL) coaches
Victoria Maple Leafs players